This is a list of Nigerian films released in 1992.

Films

See also
List of Nigerian films

References

External links
1992 films at the Internet Movie Database

1992
Lists of 1992 films by country or language
Films
1990s in Nigerian cinema